Tomislav Pelin (born 26 March 1981, in Zagreb) is a Croatian retired football player, who last played as a goalkeeper for the Slovenian PrvaLiga side Krka.

External links
 

1981 births
Living people
Footballers from Zagreb
Association football goalkeepers
Croatian footballers
Croatia youth international footballers
Croatia under-21 international footballers
NK Zagreb players
NK Slaven Belupo players
FC Zimbru Chișinău players
HNK Rijeka players
NK Krka players
Croatian Football League players
Moldovan Super Liga players
Slovenian PrvaLiga players
Croatian expatriate footballers
Expatriate footballers in Moldova
Croatian expatriate sportspeople in Moldova
Expatriate footballers in Slovenia
Croatian expatriate sportspeople in Slovenia